The dumbbell, a type of free weight, is a piece of equipment used in weight training. It is usually used individually or in pairs, with one in each hand.

History

The forerunner of the dumbbell, halteres, were used in ancient Greece as lifting weights and also as weights in the ancient Greek version of the long jump. A kind of dumbbell was also used in India for more than a millennium, shaped like a club – so it was named Indian club. The design of the "Nal", as the equipment was referred to, can be seen as a halfway point between a barbell and a dumbbell. It was generally used in pairs, in workouts by wrestlers, bodybuilders, sports players, and others wishing to increase strength and muscle size.

Etymology
The term "dumbbell" or "dumb bell" originated in late Stuart England. In 1711 the poet Joseph Addison mentioned exercising with a "dumb bell" in an essay published in The Spectator.

Although Addison elsewhere in the same publication describes having used equipment similar to the modern understanding of dumbbells, according to sport historian Jan Todd, the form of the first dumbbells remains unclear. The Oxford English Dictionary describes "apparatus similar to that used to ring a church bell, but without the bell, so noiseless or ‘dumb’", implying the action of pulling a bell rope to practice English bellringing.

Types

By the early 17th century, the familiar shape of the dumbbell, with two equal weights attached to a handle, had appeared. There are currently three main types of dumbbell:
Fixed-weight dumbbells are weights created in a dumbbell shape. Inexpensive varieties consist of cast iron, sometimes coated with rubber or neoprene for comfort, and even cheaper versions consist of a rigid plastic shell that is filled with concrete.
 Adjustable dumbbells consist of a metal bar whose centre portion is often engraved with a crosshatch pattern (knurling) to improve grip. Weight plates are slid onto the outer portions of the dumbbell and secured with clips or collars. Shown to the right is a "spinlock" dumbbell, whose ends are threaded to accept large nuts as collars. Alternatively, a dumbbell may have smooth ends with plates being secured by a sprung collar. 
Plate-loaded (adjustable) dumbbells (a.k.a. loadable dumbbells)
Spin-lock
Spring collar clips
Compression ring collar
 Ironmaster quick-lock
"Selectorized" (adjustable) dumbbells are adjustable dumbbells whose number of plates (i.e. weight) can be easily changed when resting in the dumbbell stand. This is achieved by adjusting the number of plates that follow the handle when lifted, e.g. by turning a dial or moving a selector pin — rather than manually adding or removing plates. This makes it very easy to change the weight of the dumbbell between exercises, and the stand typically doubles as storage for the additional weights not being used for a particular exercise. There are different types of mechanism:
Block type
Dial type
Glide type
Twist type
2-in-1 dumbbell/barbell

Named dumbbells
 Thomas Inch dumbbell, also known as "172" ( handle, weighs )
 Millennium dumbbell ( handle, weighs )
 Circus dumbbells: historically used in traveling circus acts, these dumbbells have exaggerated ends and wider handles, and just like normal dumbbells, come in various weights and sizes.

See also
 Barbell
 Kettlebell
 Weights
 Weight lifting belt
 Pool dumbbell
 Bulgarian Bag

References

External links
 

Weight training equipment